Ogulin is a town in north-western Croatia, in Karlovac County. It has a population of 7,389 (2021) (it was 8,216 in 2011), and a total municipal population of 12,251 (2021). Ogulin is known for its historic stone castle, known as Kula, and the nearby mountain of Klek.

Toponymy

There are several proposed etymologies for the name of Ogulin. Firstly that the surrounding woods needed to be cleared for a better defence of the town, so Ogulin received its name because of the resulting bare area ("ogolio" in Croatian) around it. There were a lot of lime-trees along the road from Ogulin towards Oštarije, and the people used to peel the bark, in order to get bass. It is suggested that Ogulin got its name from the verb to peel ("guliti" in Croatian). Neither proposal is historically confirmed.

History
Ogulin's history dates back to the fifteenth century, when it struggled against the Ottoman Turks. The exact timing of the building of the Ogulin tower has not been established. However, a document issued by Bernardin Frankopan in his town of Modruš at around 1500 AD marked off the boundaries of new castle between Modruš and Vitunj, and this is, at the same time, the first historical mention of Ogulin.  Ogulin is known for the legend of Đula (also Zuleika or Zula) who threw herself into the abyss of the River Dobra because of an unhappy love affair. In the sixteenth century, it became a military stronghold against the Ottomans.

For a brief time, between 1809 and 1813, Ogulin was a part of the Illyrian Provinces.

Until 1918, Ogulin was part of the Austrian monarchy (Kingdom of Croatia-Slavonia, Modruš-Rijeka County, after the compromise of 1867), in the Croatian Military Frontier. It was administered by the Oguliner Grenz-Infanterie-Regiment N°III before 1881.

Geography

The town of Ogulin is situated in the very centre of mainland Croatia, between Zagreb and Rijeka. It was founded in a large valley formed by two rivers: the Dobra and Zagorska Mrežnica. The administrative constitution of the town of Ogulin covers the area of 543.32 km2, and has about 14,000 inhabitants according to 2011 census.

This is a kind of transitional micro-region neighbouring the larger regions of Croatia - Gorski Kotar, Lika, Kordun and Gornje Pokuplje. The Ogulin-Modruš valley is the northern section of the Ogulin-Plaški valley, which finishes towards the south where the Modruš hills pass into the second largest field of the area under Kapela-Plaški Polje. This comprises a completed geographical whole border on the western side by the mountain massif of Velika Kapela dominated by Klek (1181 m). Its eastern edges are bordered by the mounts of Krpel, Brezovica and Hum. The valley then passes to the hilly are dominated by Klekinja and Trojvrh. This valley is also called Ogulin's Plain (in Croatian: Ogulinsko Polje). The Dobra River runs through and disappears in the center of the town.

Approximately three kilometers south of the town centre is an artificial lake Sabljaci, formed with the purpose of accumulating water from the Zagorska Mrežnica river, and for the sake of generating electricity in the Hydroelectric power plant Gojak. The lake is connected with the town's other artificial lake, lake Bukovnik, via a tunnel. Lake Bukovnik is approximately one kilometer away from lake Sabljaci, and is connected to the hydroelectric power plant Gojak also with a tunnel, approximately 10 km long. The surface area of lake Sabljaci is around 170 ha, which makes it the 11th Croatian lake when compared by size. The lake contains many kinds of fish species, and it is also used for swimming and various water sports.

 Elevation: 323 m (1060 ft) above sea level
 Latitude: 45° 15' 59"
 Longitude: 15° 13' 44"

Climate

Population

According to the 2011 census, Croats comprise 80.2% and Serbs 17.7% of the municipality population. Serbs form a majority in many villages, most of them are upland.

The settlements in the municipality are:

 Desmerice, population 262
 Donje Dubrave, population 199
 Donje Zagorje, population 230
 Drežnica, population 516
 Dujmić Selo, population 142
 Gornje Dubrave, population 90
 Gornje Zagorje, population 297
 Hreljin Ogulinski, population 549
 Jasenak, population 226
 Marković Selo, population 56
 Ogulin, population 8,216
 Otok Oštarijski, population 381
 Ponikve, population 98
 Popovo Selo, population 46
 Potok Musulinski, population 91
 Puškarići, population 439
 Ribarići, population 337
 Sabljak Selo, population 254
 Salopek Selo, population 246
 Sveti Petar, population 651
 Trošmarija, population 127
 Turkovići Ogulinski, population 249
 Vitunj, population 98
 Zagorje, population 115

Culture

Parish Church of the Extolling Saint Cross 

This church was built in 1781 in the middle of the town, in the Park of King Tomislav. Consecrated on June 1, 179, it reflects the spirit of the time with its pleasing external appearance and the richness of various sculptural decorations. The town of Ogulin celebrates September 14 as the fest day of its patron Saint of Extolling of the Cross.

Saint Bernard Chapel 
Bernardin Frankopan, the son of Stjepan, and the founder of the town of Ogulin, erected a chapel in 16th century both for nobleman and ordinary people within the castle. It is devoted to St Bernardin. This chapel was the parish church from 1521 until the building of the church of St Cross in 1781. Today, only the altar has been preserved.

Saint Rocco Chapel 
This chapel was built at the entrance to the town in the first half of 19th century as a votive church against cholera.

Frankopan Castle 

The Castle was built between 1493 and 1500 above the gorge of the River Dobra - Đula's abyss. The founder of the town was Bernardin Frankopan, one of the mightiest people of his time, and the feudal master of Modruš, Plaški, Vitunj, Tounj, Zvečaj, Bosiljevo, Novigrad and Dubovac. The Frankopans resided in the castle until 1533, when it was relinquished to the soldiers of the Military Frontier.

It belongs to the period of Renaissance castles. The town walls surrounded the courtyard area on three sides, while on the fourth there was a three-storey building with towers at the sides.

The County Museum 
The County Museum of Ogulin was opened in July 1967 in several of the Frankopan Castle halls that were being renovated and prepared between 1960 and 1967. At the time of opening it hosted a collection of works related to the workers movement, and NOB, while today it is hosting collections of various kinds: collection of stone monuments, collection of Croatian War of Independence, ethnographic collection, the memorial room of Ivana Brlić-Mažuranić (a renowned Croatian fairy-tale author), mountaineering, archaeological collection, Cell number 6, and an exhibition of the academic painter Stjepan Galetić born in Ogulin. The museum also collects objects related to old crafts and trades, old weaponry, old photographs, and the collection of postcards and greeting cards.

Considering that the County Museum of Ogulin is the only museum in the entire area between the cities of Rijeka and Karlovac, it is the only institution that works on preserving the valuable cultural and historic heritage of that wider area, and as such its task is to collect, process, present and publish the historical and cultural works, documents, and other artistic artefacts from the area of Ogulin and its neighbouring areas.

King Tomislav Monument 

The monument was erected in 1925, for the 1000th anniversary of the founding of the Croatian kingdom. It stands in the Park of King Tomislav which was planned and arranged in the 18th century. The monument was made according to the design of the Slovenian architect Vitburg Meck, and was repaired in 1990.

Cesarovac Fountain 
This classic building is also erected in the Park. It represents a memorial to the Ogulin aqueduct and was built by colonel Stevan Šuplikac from Ogulin in 1847. Water flowed from the spring through wooden tubes which were lately replaced by the clay, and in 1882 by the iron tubes. For Cesarovac source is connected and a legend. Water flows into the source, comes from a source located at the foot of the mountain Klek. And as on the mountain Klek lived a witch, so the water is magical. Legend says, that women who drink the water from the springs, will remain forever young. And men who drink water from springs, water will be captured to forever remain in this city, who you will fall in love with a woman from Ogulin, and by the end of life remain to live in Ogulin.

Notable people

 Ivana Brlić-Mažuranić - writer
 Vladimir Goldner - physician, academic and professor 
 Josip Kregar - lawyer and politician
 Elza Polak - horticulturist
 Ema Pukšec (also known as Ilma De Murska) - opera singer
 Barbara Radulović - television host
 Petar Stipetić - general
 Ante Pavić - tennis player
 Luka Cindrić - handball player

References

External links

 
 Ogulin portal
 Blog site about Ogulin
 Another blog site about Ogulin
 Blog site about Handball school Ogulin
 The "Domaći" Tourist agency, Ogulin

 
Cities and towns in Croatia
Populated places in Karlovac County
Modruš-Rijeka County